Square of Violence is a 1961 drama film directed by Leonardo Bercovici and written by Eric Bercovici and Leonardo Bercovici. The film, shot in Yugoslavia, stars Broderick Crawford, Valentina Cortese, Branko Pleša, Bibi Andersson and Anita Björk. The film was released on July 7, 1961, by Metro-Goldwyn-Mayer.

Plot
Set in Italy, the story takes place in this very country, during WW2, where German occupation army ruled everything, just before the allied forces came, in 1944. Crawford plays here a doctor whose son has been shot by the Germans. Of course he has no more taste in life. He continues his work as a German officers' physician. One day, he throws a bomb just in the middle of German troops. Many soldiers and officers are killed. Some time later, the lead officer of the Nazis troops suspects the doctor to be the responsible of the explosion. He lets him know that he himself knows.

Cast 
Broderick Crawford as Dr. Stefan Bernardi
Valentina Cortese as Erica Bernardi
Branko Plesa as Major Kohler
Bibi Andersson as Maria
Anita Björk as Sophia
Bert Sotlar as Partisan Leader
Dragomir Felba as Serafin
Viktor Starcic as German Commandant
Nikola Simic as Radio Operator
Yugoslav People's Army and Captain First Class Dragiša Blagojevic

References

External links 
 

1961 films
American drama films
1961 drama films
Metro-Goldwyn-Mayer films
Films shot in Yugoslavia
Italian Campaign of World War II films
Films set in Yugoslavia
1960s English-language films
1960s American films